Vitale Faliero Dodoni (also known as Falier de' Doni) and usually known in English as Vitale Falier was the 32nd Doge of Venice from 1084 until his death in 1095.

Life
He was a member of a noble Venetian family, probably from Fano. A ducal councillor, he was elected Doge in the revolt that overthrew Domenico Selvo in December 1084, probably initiated by Faliero himself, among others. He is the first Doge whose image is known, being allegedly portrayed next to the high altar of St. Mark's Basilica.

When he became Doge, Venice was supporting the Byzantine Empire in the war against the Normans under Robert Guiscard (see Siege of Durazzo). In the spring of 1095, the Venetian fleet obtained a great naval victory at Butrint (in modern-day Albania) that avenged Selvo's defeat at Corfu. The recovery in the prestige of the city is testified by the visit of Emperor Henry IV, to whom it was allied during the Investiture Controversy against the pope, for the consecration of St. Mark's church, the rebuilding of which was completed at this time.

During the latter part of his reign the city was hit by an earthquake, a sea storm, and a heavy famine.

Faliero died in December 1095. He was married to Cornella Bembo. His son Ordelafo became a subsequent Doge.

Sources

References 

11th-century births
1095 deaths
Burials at St Mark's Basilica
11th-century Doges of Venice